Dante Garrison Pettis (born October 23, 1995) is an American football wide receiver who is a free agent. He played college football at Washington.

Early years
Pettis attended JSerra Catholic High School in San Juan Capistrano, California. He played football, basketball and ran track. As a senior, he recorded 50 receptions for 889 yards and 11 touchdown receptions. He committed to the University of Washington to play college football.

College career

Freshman season
As a true freshman for Washington in 2014, Pettis had 17 receptions for 259 yards and a touchdown. He also added 288 punt return yards and a punt return touchdown.

Sophomore season
As a sophomore, he recorded 30 receptions for 414 yards and a touchdown reception with 271 punt return yards and two punt return touchdowns.

Junior season
As a junior, he finished with 53 receptions, 822 yards, 15 touchdown receptions, 287 punt return yards and two touchdowns.

Senior season
As a senior in 2017 against the Oregon Ducks, he broke the record for most career punt return touchdowns in NCAA history. Pettis garnered consensus All-America honors as a result of being named a first-team All-American by the AFCA, FWAA, Walter Camp Football Foundation, and The Sporting News. He finished the season with 63 receptions, 761 yards, and seven touchdown receptions, as well as 428 punt return yards and four touchdowns.

Professional career

San Francisco 49ers
The San Francisco 49ers selected Pettis in the second round (44th overall) of the 2018 NFL Draft. He was the fourth wide receiver to be selected that year. In the season-opener against the Minnesota Vikings, Pettis made his NFL debut and caught two passes for 61 receiving yards and a touchdown. In addition, he returned two punts for 14 yards in the 24–16 loss. On December 29, 2018, Pettis was placed on injured reserve after suffering a knee injury. Pettis finished his rookie season with 27 receptions for 467 yards and five touchdowns.

In Pettis' second season, he caught 11 receptions for 109 yards and two touchdowns.

On November 3, 2020, Pettis was waived by the San Francisco 49ers.

New York Giants
On November 4, 2020, Pettis was claimed off waivers by the New York Giants. He was placed on the reserve/COVID-19 list by the team on November 20, 2020, and activated on December 1.

In his first game played as a New York Giant, on December 27, 2020, against the Baltimore Ravens, Pettis finished with two receptions for 33 yards. He caught his first touchdown as a Giant the next week, against the Dallas Cowboys, for 33 yards. Pettis finished his 2020 campaign with four receptions, for 76 yards, averaging 19 yards a reception, and one touchdown.

On September 1, 2021, Pettis was waived by the Giants and re-signed to the practice squad. On October 19, 2021, Pettis was signed to active roster.  In week 7 against the Carolina Panthers Dante Pettis had five catches for 39 yards and a touchdown while adding the 16-yard pass to Daniel Jones. On November 5. 2021, Pettis was placed on injured reserve with a shoulder injury.

Chicago Bears
On May 11, 2022, the Chicago Bears signed Pettis. On October 14, Pettis caught four passes for 84 yards and the Bears’ only touchdown, during a 7-12 loss to the Washington Commanders.

NFL statistics

Personal life
His father, Gary Pettis, played in Major League Baseball (MLB) and is a coach for the Houston Astros. His brother, Kyler Pettis, is an actor and his cousin, Austin Pettis, played in the NFL.

References

External links
Washington Huskies bio
San Francisco 49ers bio

1995 births
Living people
All-American college football players
American football return specialists
American football wide receivers
New York Giants players
People from San Clemente, California
Players of American football from California
San Francisco 49ers players
Sportspeople from Orange County, California
Washington Huskies football players
Chicago Bears players